The Tenth Decade is a Canadian documentary television miniseries which aired on CBC Television in 1971.

Premise
The series presented Canada's political history between 1957 and 1967, or the tenth decade since the nation's Confederation. John Diefenbaker of the Progressive Conservative party became Prime Minister in the 1957 election. He was defeated by Lester B. Pearson and his Liberal party in 1963. The series concentrated on the lives and careers of both Diefenbaker and Pearson, supported by interview and archival footage.

The music score was composed by Larry Crosley and performed by several orchestras which were not credited in the series, including the Toronto Symphony Orchestra.

Scheduling
This hour-long series was broadcast on Wednesdays at 9:00 p.m. from 27 October to 22 December 1971. It was rebroadcast on CBC Television at various times in 1972 and 1976.

Episodes

No episode was broadcast on 17 November 1971 due to a Canadian Football League game.

See also
Graham later produced separate miniseries on prime ministers Diefenbaker and Pearson:

 First Person Singular: Pearson – The Memoirs of a Prime Minister (1973)
 One Canadian: The Political Memoirs of the Rt. Hon. John G. Diefenbaker (1976–77)

References

External links
 
 

CBC Television original programming
1971 Canadian television series debuts
1971 Canadian television series endings
1970s Canadian documentary television series
1970s Canadian television miniseries